Nathalie Geeris (born 20 December 1971) is a Dutch retired football midfielder or forward. She played for clubs in the Netherlands, Japan, the United States and Sweden, as well as for the Netherlands women's national football team.

Club career

After beginning her football with local minnows HFC Spaarnestad, Geeris transferred to top division Ter Leede to secure her national team place. At 21 years old she moved to America and participated in college soccer with Franklin Pierce Ravens. In 1996, Geeris secured a contract with Suzuyo Shimizu F.C. Lovely Ladies, a professional club in the Japanese L. League.

In 2000 Geeris was back in America, playing for Boston Renegades of the USL W-League. She was in evidence at a pre-draft combine prior to the 2000 WUSA Draft, but was not selected. As a veteran Geeris enjoyed a prolific spell in the Swedish lower divisions with IF Böljan.

International career
On 11 April 1989, 17-year-old Geeris debuted for the senior Netherlands women's national football team, playing in a 1–1 draw with Norway in Denekamp. In April 1992 she scored both goals in the Netherlands' 2–1 win over Sweden, which brought her to the attention of Franklin Pierce Ravens coach Mark Krikorian who swooped with a scholarship offer.

Personal life
During her playing career Geeris was in a relationship with Anneli Andelén.

References

External links
Profile at Onsoranje.nl 

1971 births
Living people
Footballers from Haarlem
Dutch women's footballers
Netherlands women's international footballers
Expatriate women's footballers in Japan
Expatriate women's footballers in Sweden
Expatriate women's soccer players in the United States
Dutch expatriate sportspeople in the United States
Dutch expatriate sportspeople in Japan
Lesbian sportswomen
LGBT association football players
Dutch LGBT sportspeople
BK Häcken FF players
Damallsvenskan players
Suzuyo Shimizu FC Lovely Ladies players
Nadeshiko League players
Women's association football forwards
USL W-League (1995–2015) players
Öxabäcks IF players
Dutch expatriate women's footballers
Franklin Pierce Ravens women's soccer players
Ter Leede players
Dutch expatriate sportspeople in Sweden
Boston Renegades players